Sofía Stefani Espinoza Álvarez is a Mexican–American author, researcher, and advocate.  As a researcher and criminologist, she has participated in an intensive program of research aimed at providing readers with evidence-based information and analysis of the issues of Latinos in the United States.

Education
She is a law graduate from Universidad de León in Mexico, and holds a Bachelor of Science degree in criminal justice from Sul Ross State University in Texas, United States.  Her areas of legal interest include Mexican and American jurisprudence, philosophy of law, constitutional law, immigration law, law and society, and penology. She is now studying a master's degree in Political Analisis at the Universidad of Guanajuato.

Academic career
Álvarez maintains an active professional career and research and publication agenda, publishing various academic book chapters, journal articles, and books.  Her research has been published in national and international peer-reviewed journals, including "Capital Punishment on Trial:  Who Lives, Who Dies, Who Decides—A Question of Justice?" (Criminal Law Bulletin, 2014); and "Neoliberalism, Criminal Justice, and Latinos:  The Contours of Neoliberal Economic Thought and Policy on Criminalization" (Latino Studies, 2016).  Her books include, Immigration and the Law:  Race, Citizenship, and Social Control Over Time (forthcoming); Ethnicity and Criminal Justice in the Era of Mass Incarceration: A Critical Reader on the Latino Experience (2017); and Latino Police Officers in the United States:  An Examination of Emerging Trends and Issues (2015).

Activism and philanthropy
In addition to her work as a legal scholar and academic endeavors in research, publication, and social activism, Álvarez assists people with immigration-related issues, including visa requirements, judicial and legal translations, and procedures for obtaining different types of visas for legal residence.  Conjointly, Álvarez endeavors as a columnist at Univision and Huffington Post where she portrays her research on the ethnic realities of Latinos and the U.S. legal system, and illustrates the importance of key issues, such as representation.

Vested in positive social transformation, since 2013, Álvarez has been working with migrants traveling to the U.S. through Mexico, seeing first-hand the global dynamics of immigration, and thus prompting her to start a non-profit organization, the Empower Global Foundation.

Political participation
Álvarez has been a part of pro-society and pro-migrant associations, such as Operation Monarca. She was an organizer of the human wall that took place along the US-Mexico border in February 2017 in solidarity with the migrants.

Being involved in social movements and not being a militant of any political party, she was invited by the movement pro-independent candidates in Mexico, to work as state coordinator of the Movimiento Ola 365, for local and federal Mexican elections of 2018. Ola 365's central objective is to position 365 independent candidates, in an attempt to "refresh" the Mexican political system.

Works or publications
Hispanics in the U.S. Criminal Justice System:  Ethnicity, Ideology, and Social Control, with Martin Guevara Urbina (2018). 
Immigration and the Law: Race, Citizenship, and Social Control, with Martin Guevara Urbina (2018). .
Ethnicity and Criminal Justice in the Era of Mass Incarceration:  A Critical Reader on the Latino Experience, with Martin Guevara Urbina (2017).  
 Latino Police Officers in the United States: An Examination of Emerging Trends and Issues (2015).  .

References

External links
 
 

1989 births
Living people
Place of birth missing (living people)
American academics of Mexican descent
American criminologists
Mexican criminologists
American women writers
Latin Americanists
Mexican columnists
Mexican democracy activists
Mexican emigrants to the United States
People from Mexico City
American women columnists
Mexican women columnists
American women criminologists
Mexican women criminologists
21st-century American women